Craugastor occidentalis is a species of frog in the family Craugastoridae.
It is endemic to Mexico.
Its natural habitat is subtropical or tropical dry forests.

References

occidentalis
Amphibians described in 1941
Taxonomy articles created by Polbot